Calliostoma tittarium is a species of sea snail, a marine gastropod mollusk in the family Calliostomatidae.

Description
The height of the shell attains 3.5 mm

Distribution
This shell occurs in the Atlantic Ocean off Georgia, USA, at depths between 538 m and 805 m.

References

External links
 To Biodiversity Heritage Library (1 publication)
 To Encyclopedia of Life
 To USNM Invertebrate Zoology Mollusca Collection
 To USNM Invertebrate Zoology Mollusca Collection
 To ITIS
 To World Register of Marine Species

tittarium
Gastropods described in 1927